The Loren Bridge is a unique bridge that crosses the Loren River, and is located in Chukotsky District, Chukotka Autonomous Okrug, Russia.

Construction required the structure to span a river delta, a notable engineering feat in Russia's Far East.

The first bridge crossing the Loren was constructed in the 1990s, but the difficult Arctic conditions quickly led to the bridge falling into disrepair. The old bridge was deemed unfit for use and is in the process of dismantlement in favor of the new Loren Bridge.

Building of the new bridge started in 2007 in Vladivostok, where the structure was designed and materials were assembled in order to ship them to the bridge site. 
In 2008, the FESCO shipping company delivered construction materials and cement for building of the new crossing by boat from the port of Vladivostok to Lorino.

The Steam-ship "Amur" was dispatched for the task on June 12, 2008.

Initial estimates had the bridge being open to the public on October 30, 2009.
The bridge opened on November 2, 2009, when the commission led by the Chief of the Department of Building, Reconstruction and Repair of Highways and Management of Highways, Chukotka Autonomous Okrug, Evgeny Bessonov officially approved the structure for use by the public. The Loren Bridge is the first of a series of projects being undertaken under the guidance of Mikhail Zelensky in order to improve Chukotka's infrastructure. Construction of a similar bridge is currently underway over the river Kukun, which is scheduled for completion in 2010. There are also other plans to build similar structures on the rivers of Big and Small Akkani.

Notes

Bridges completed in 2009
Road bridges in Russia
Bridges over the Loren River
Buildings and structures in the Russian Far East